Head Light is the third album by Trance Mission, released on October 21, 1996 through City of Tribes Records.

Track listing

Personnel 
Trance Mission
Beth Custer – alto clarinet, bass clarinet, trumpet, ocarina, txistu, percussion, bells, voice
Stephen Kent – didgeridoo, cello, drums, percussion, shaker
John Loose – drums, dumbek, tabla, piano, sampler, shaker
Kenneth Newby – sampler, suling, drums, percussion
Production and additional personnel
Ken Adams – cover art
Anne Hamersky – photography
Mike Johnson – mixing
Christian Jones – recording
Georgia Rucker – design
Simon Tassano – production, mixing

References

External links 
 

1996 albums
Trance Mission albums